Natalia Esther Henríquez Carreño (born 9 July 1985) is a Chilean public administrator who was elected as a member of the Chilean Constitutional Convention.

References

External links
 BCN Profile

1985 births

Living people
Chilean people
21st-century Chilean politicians
Members of the List of the People
Members of the Chilean Constitutional Convention